Keitha Latisha Dickerson (born April 20, 1978) is a former professional basketball player who played two years in the WNBA.

WNBA career statistics

Regular season

|-
| align="left" | 2000
| align="left" | Minnesota
| style="background:#D3D3D3"|32° || 29 || 24.7 || .380 || .000 || .756 || 4.4 || 1.8 || 1.2 || 0.1 || 2.2 || 4.4
|-
| align="left" | 2001
| align="left" | Utah
| 4 || 0 || 1.5 || – || – || .000 || 0.3 || 0.3 || 0.0 || 0.0 || 0.0 || 0.0
|-
| align="left" | Career
| align="left" | 2 years, 2 teams
| 36 || 29 || 22.1 || .380 || .000 || .694 || 3.9 || 1.7 || 1.0 || 0.1 || 1.9 || 3.9

Honors and awards

College
1999 Big 12 honorable mention selection
All-Tournament team selections
Big 12 Rookie of the Week for Dec. 9
Invited to the USA Women's Junior National Team Trials.

Personal life
Dickerson was involved in drama club, speech club, and math-science club while in high school. She majored in Exercise and Sports Science at Texas Tech.

References

External links
All-Time WNBA Draft List | WNBA

1978 births
Living people
American women's basketball players
Basketball players from Oklahoma
Forwards (basketball)
Minnesota Lynx draft picks
Minnesota Lynx players
People from Elk City, Oklahoma
Texas Tech Lady Raiders basketball players
Utah Starzz players